Jason Dewey Jones (born October 17, 1976) is a former professional baseball outfielder. He played part of one season in Major League Baseball, appearing in 40 games for the Texas Rangers in 2003.

External links

Major League Baseball outfielders
Texas Rangers players
Pulaski Rangers players
Kennesaw State Owls baseball players
USC Trojans baseball players
Savannah Sand Gnats players
Tulsa Drillers players
Charlotte Rangers players
Oklahoma RedHawks players
Baseball players from Georgia (U.S. state)
1976 births
Living people
San Diego High School alumni